{{DISPLAYTITLE:C20H29ClO2}}
The molecular formula C20H29ClO2 (molar mass: 336.896 g/mol) may refer to:

 Chlorodehydromethylandrostenediol
 Methylclostebol

External links
 Compound Summary of C20H29ClO2 on NIH

Molecular formulas